Mary Alice is an American actress.

Mary Alice may also refer to:

Mary Alice, Kentucky, a community in Harlan County, Kentucky
, a United States Navy patrol vessel
Mary Alice Young, fictional character in the television series Desperate Housewives

See also